In Eastern Orthodox Christian tradition the Myrrhbearers (Greek: Μυροφόροι; Latin: Myrophorae; Serbian: мироноснице; Slavonic: Жены́-мѷроно́сицы) are the individuals mentioned in the New Testament who were directly involved in the burial or who discovered the empty tomb following the resurrection of Jesus. The term traditionally refers to the women with myrrh who came to the tomb of Christ early in the morning to find it empty. In Western Christianity, the two women at the tomb, the Three Marys or other variants are the terms normally used. Also included are Joseph of Arimathea and Nicodemus, who took the body of Jesus down from the cross, embalmed it with myrrh and aloes, wrapped it in clean linen, and placed it in a new tomb..

The women followed Jesus during his earthly ministry in Galilee, providing for him and his followers out of their own means. They remained faithful to him even during the most dangerous time of his arrest and execution, and not only stood by the cross, but accompanied him to his burial, noticing where the tomb was located. Because of the impending Sabbath, it was necessary for the burial preparations to be brief. Jewish custom at the time dictated that mourners return to the tomb every day for three days.  Once the Sabbath had passed, the women returned at the earliest possible moment, bringing myrrh to anoint the body. It was at this point that the Resurrection was revealed to them, and they were commissioned to go and tell the Apostles. They were, in effect, the apostles to the Apostles. For this reason, the myrrhbearing women, especially Mary Magdalene, are sometimes referred to as "Equal to the Apostles."

Joseph of Arimathea was a disciple of Jesus, but secretly. He went to Pontius Pilate and asked for the body of Jesus and, together with Nicodemus, hurriedly prepared the body for burial. He donated his own new tomb for the burial. Joseph was an "honourable counselor, who waited (or "was searching") for the kingdom of God". Luke describes him as "a good man, and just".

Nicodemus (Greek: Νικόδημος) was a Pharisee and also a member of the Sanhedrin, who is first mentioned early in the Gospel of John, when he visits Jesus to listen to his teachings, but he comes by night out of fear.  He is mentioned again when he states the teaching of the Law of Moses concerning the arrest of Jesus during the Feast of Tabernacles.  He is last mentioned following the Crucifixion, when he and Joseph of Arimathea prepare the body of Jesus for burial.  There is an apocryphal Gospel of Nicodemus that purports to be written by him.

Names of the Myrrhbearers

The Myrrhbearers are traditionally listed as:
Mary Magdalene 
Mary, the mother of James and Joses
Mary, the wife of Cleopas
Martha of Bethany, Sister of Lazarus
Mary of Bethany, Sister of Lazarus
Joanna the wife of Chuza, the steward of Herod Antipas
Salome, the mother of James and John, the sons of Zebedee
Susanna
Joseph of Arimathea
Nicodemus

There are also generally accepted to be other Myrrhbearers, whose names are not known.

Liturgical references

In the Eastern Orthodox and Greek Catholic churches, the Third Sunday of Pascha (i.e. the second Sunday after Easter) is called the 'Sunday of the Myrrhbearers'.  The Scripture readings appointed for the services on this day emphasize the role of these individuals in the Death and Resurrection of Jesus: Matins Gospel—, Divine Liturgy Epistle— and Gospel—.

Since this day commemorates events surrounding not only the Resurrection, but also the entombment of Christ, some of the hymns from Holy Saturday are repeated.  These include the Troparion of the Day: "The noble Joseph..." (but with a new line added at the end, commemorating the Resurrection), and the Doxastikhon at the Vespers Aposticha: "Joseph together with Nicodemus..."

The week that follows is called the Week of the Myrrhbearers and the Troparion mentioned above is used every day at the Canonical Hours and the Divine Liturgy. The Doxastikhon is repeated again at Vespers on Wednesday and Friday evenings.

Many of the Myrrhbearers also have separate feast days on which they are commemorated individually in the Menaion.

There are numerous liturgical hymns which speak of the Myrrhbearers, especially in the Sunday Octoechos and in the Pentecostarion. Every Sunday, there is a special hymn that is chanted at Matins and the Midnight Office, called the Hypakoë, (Greek: Ύπακοί, Slavonic: Ўпаκои), which means, "sent", and refers to the Myrrhbearing women being sent to announce the Resurrection to the Apostles.

There are several prominent Orthodox cathedrals and churches named after the Myrrhbearers.  They celebrate their patronal feast day on the Sunday of the Myrrhbearers.

In 2022, Joanna, Mary, and Salome were officially added to the Episcopal Church liturgical calendar with a feast day as the "myrrh-bearing women" on 3 August.

Role of the Myrrhbearers
In the Gospels, especially the synoptics, women play a central role as eyewitness at Jesus' death, entombment, and in the discovery of the empty tomb. All three synoptics repeatedly make women the subject of verbs of seeing, clearly presenting them as eyewitnesses.

The presence of women as the key witnesses who discover the empty tomb has been seen as increasing the credibility of the testimony, since, in the contemporary culture (Jewish and Greco-Roman), one might expect a fabrication to place men, and especially numerous and important men, at this critical place, rather than just "some grieving women." C. H. Dodd considered the narrative in John to be "self-authenticating", arguing that no one would make up the notion that Jesus had appeared to the "little known woman" Mary Magdalene. However, some passages in the Mishnah (Yebamoth 16:7; Ketubot 2:5; Eduyot 3:6) indicate that women could give testimony if there was no male witness available. Also, Josephus and Pliny the Younger have used women as witnesses to their claims. In addition, Paul does not mention the women. Bart D. Ehrman argues:
"One of Mark's overarching themes is that virtually no one during the ministry of Jesus could understand who he was. His family didn't understand. His townspeople didn't understand. The leaders of his own people didn't understand. Not even the disciples understood in Mark—especially not the disciples! For Mark, only outsiders have an inkling of who Jesus was: the unnamed woman who anointed him, the centurion at the cross. Who understands at the end? Not the family of Jesus! Not the disciples! It's a group of previously unknown women…the women at the tomb…."

All three Synoptics name two or three women on each occasion in the passion-resurrection narratives where they are cited as eyewitnesses: the Torah's required two or three witnesses in a statute that had exerted influence beyond legal courts and into situations in everyday life where accurate evidence was needed. Among the named women (and some are left anonymous), Mary Magdalene is present in all four Gospel accounts, and Mary the mother of James is present in all three synoptics; however, variations exist in the lists of each Gospel concerning the women present at the death, entombment, and discovery. For example, Mark names three women at the cross and the same three who go to the tomb, but only two are observed to be witnesses at the burial. Based on this, and similar examples in Matthew and Luke, Richard Bauckham argued that the evangelists showed "scrupulous care" and "were careful to name precisely the women who were known to them as witnesses to these crucial events" since there would be no other reason, besides interest in historical accuracy, not to simply use the same set of characters from one scene to another.

Mark's account (which in the earliest extant manuscripts) ends abruptly and claims that the women told no one. The Gospels of Matthew and Mark do not present any further involvement at the tomb. Luke describes Peter as running to the tomb to check for himself, and John adds that the Beloved Disciple did so too, the beloved disciple outrunning Peter.

See also
 Life of Jesus in the New Testament
 Saintes-Maries-de-la-Mer
 The Three Marys
 Bereavement in Judaism
 Holy anointing oil

References

External links

Sunday of the Holy Myrrhbearing Women Icon and Synaxarion

 
Angelic visionaries
Resurrection of Jesus
1st-century Christian female saints
Types of saints
Women in the New Testament
Bible-related lists of people

Groups of Christian saints
Empty tomb
Myrrh